Recreate Greece is a Greek right-wing political party, which has adopted an ideology heavily focused on anti-immigration, anti-Islam and anti-communism.

History
Founded in December 2011, it is led by Thanos Tzimeros and is self-identified as a citizen-centered political movement, with emphasis on the rebuilding of the Greek state.

The party participated in the May 2012 Greek legislative election shortly after being founded, receiving 2.15% of the total vote, short of the 3% threshold needed to enter Parliament. In the repeat elections in June, it formed an electoral alliance with Drasi, a fellow liberal party that had finished directly below them in the May election with 1.8% of the vote. Recreate Greece also approached Democratic Alliance, but the latter opted to run on the New Democracy list instead. In the 17 June 2012 elections, the combined parties garnered only 1.59%, a lower vote than either got in the elections the month before. Drasi would later merge with New Democracy, while Recreate Greece declined further, receiving 0.53% in the 2015 election and 0.74% in 2019. In 2020, Thanos Tzimeros announced a new coaliation with far-right politician Failos Kranidiotis, which was later merged with a new party formed by Greek conservative MP Constantinos Bogdanos, and named National Creation.

Ideology and leadership 
Originally, the party's ideology has been referred to as classical liberalism and that it used to promote neoliberal ideas of free markets and small government. Because of his involvement for over a decade, it is widely believed that the party's leader Thanos Tzimeros shapes the party's ideology. His speeches and beliefs have changed over the years, shifting the party further to the right. He has been described as extreme or far-right. Tzimeros has described the Greek Communist Party as dangerous and that it must be outlawed, whilst he compares it to neo-Nazism. In some cases, he even expressed controversial opinions about the Greek National Resistance being a historical crime. He tends to have controversial views on migration, which have been described as racist, and often proclaims that Islam is a threat.

Other notable incidents include Tzimeros' calls to overthrow the government in June 2015 which led to a criminal investigation.

Election results

Hellenic Parliament

European Parliament

References

External links

 Party website (in English)

2012 establishments in Greece
Political parties established in 2012
Liberal parties in Greece
Classical liberal parties
Conservative liberal parties
Libertarian parties
National liberal parties
Nationalist parties in Greece
Pro-European political parties in Greece